Simon Coombs (born 6 April 1976) is an Australian swimmer. He competed in the men's 200 metre individual medley event at the 1996 Summer Olympics.

References

External links
 

1976 births
Living people
Australian male medley swimmers
Olympic swimmers of Australia
Swimmers at the 1996 Summer Olympics
Swimmers from Melbourne